Lake Yanisyarvi is a lake in the Republic of Karelia, Russia, located north of and draining to Lake Ladoga.

The basin of this somewhat circular lake was formed by meteorite impact 700±5 million years ago during the Cryogenian period.

Prior to World War II, the lake was thought to be the second known volcanic caldera in Finland (the other was Lake Lappajärvi). Both were eventually recognized as impact craters.

References

External links
Lake Jänisjärvi Impact Crater at NASA Earth Observatory

Impact craters of Russia
Lakes of the Republic of Karelia
LYanisyarvi
Impact craters of the Arctic
Impact crater lakes